Ion Negură is a Moldovan politician and professor at Moldova State University.

Biography 

He served as member of the Parliament of Moldova.

References

External links 
 Declaraţia deputaţilor din primul Parlament
 Site-ul Parlamentului Republicii Moldova

Living people
Moldovan MPs 1990–1994
Popular Front of Moldova MPs
Year of birth missing (living people)